Mario Amura (born 1973) is an Italian photographer and cinematographer.

Career
After graduating in International Law from Naples University, Amura attended cinematography classes at Centro sperimentale di cinematografia (Experimental film centre or Italian National film school), in Rome. His career as a photographer started in 1993. In 1999, Studio d’Arte Memoli in Milan published the first catalogue of his photographic collected works. His debut as a professional cinematographer was in 2003 with Maurizio Fiume's full feature E io ti seguo  (I Will Follow You), a selection at the Montreal World Film Festival. Amongst some of his other major credits since 2003 is his collaboration with the Italian film director Vincenzo Marra, three documentaries (Pasaggio a Sud, L’udienza è aperta, Il grande progetto), and the 2004 feature film Vento di terra (Earth Wind), awarded at the 61st Venice Film Festival by Fipresci as most innovative movie. Amura's cinematography of Vento di Terra has been awarded the Giuseppe Rotunno award. With film director Paolo Sorrentino, Amura worked on the TV version of Eduardo De Filippo's drama Sabato, domenica e lunedì, the short movie La notte lunga, and the documentary La primavera del 2002. L’Italia protesta. L’Italia si ferma. In 2004, Amura worked with Luca Guadagnino on Cuoco contadino (Farmer Chef), and the following year he was involved in the making of Melissa P.. In 2005, he worked on Sorry, You Can't Get Through! by Paolo Genovese and Luca Miniero. With Luca Miniero, Amura also shot several advertising spots. In 2007, he worked on Saverio Costanzo's movie In memoria di me (In Memory of Me), for whose cinematography he was once again awarded the Giuseppe Rotunno award and nominated for the Ciak d’oro award. In 2010, Amura worked on Sabina Guzzanti's documentary Draquila – L'Italia che trema, Alessandro Aronadio's Due vite per caso (One Life, Maybe Two), and Paola Randi's Into paradiso. His list of collaborations with Italian film directors also includes Nina Di Maio, Volfango De Biasi, and Serafino Murri.

As a film director, in 2003, Amura shot Racconto di guerra (War Story), a short movie set in Sarajevo during the Balkan war. The short was awarded the David di Donatello for Best Short Film the same year and the Ciak d'oro for best short movie in 2004.

Since 2007, Amura has been working on a photographic live-performance project, StopEmotion, now developed by Emoticron as a special software to live-edit real-time videos from sequences of pictures played to music. In November 2014, Amura founded and became CCO of Emoticron, an innovative startup based in Naples, Italy. Its mission is simplifying and reinventing photo/video sharing through software enabling users to "play images as music notes", live-recording and editing sequences of pre-selected pictures on a chosen musical score. Since then, Emoticron has developed the web application and mobile app StopEmotion.

Awards
 David di Donatello:
2003: best short movie (won) Racconto di guerra
 Giuseppe Rotunno Award
2005: best cinematography (won) – Vento di terra

2007: best cinematography (won)  – In memoria di me
 Ciak d'oro
2004: best short movie (won) – Racconto di guerra

2007: best cinematography (nominated) In memoria di me

Selected filmography
As cinematographer
 Monna Lisa, short by Matteo Delbò (2000)
 La notte lunga, short by Paolo Sorrentino (2001)
 Generazioni d'amore: Le quattro Americhe di Fernanda Pivano, by Ottavio Rosati (2001)
 Coppia (o le misure dell'amore), short by Paolo Genovese and Luca Miniero (2002)
 L'ultimo rimasto in piedi, short by Ugo Capolupo (2002)
 Ritratto di bambino, short by Gianluca Iodice (2002)
 On est venu me chercher, short by Ilana Navaro (2003)
 E io ti seguo, by Maurizio Fiume (2003)
 Paesaggio a sud, short by Vincenzo Marra (2003)
 Cuoco contadino, by Luca Guadagnino (2004)
 Vento di terra, by Vincenzo Marra (2004)
 Sorry, You Can't Get Through!, by Paolo Genovese and Luca Miniero (2005)
 The Changing of the Guard, short by Serafino Murri (2005)
 Melissa P., by Luca Guadagnino (2005)
 Sabato, domenica e lunedì, by Paolo Sorrentino (TV - 2004)
 Ti lascio perché ti amo troppo, by Francesco Ranieri Martinotti (2006)
 Il vizio dell'amore, by Valia Santella (TV - 1 episode, 2006)
 L'udienza è aperta, by Vincenzo Marra (2006)
 In memoria di me, by Saverio Costanzo (2007)
 Solo amore, by Volfango De Biasi (2008)
 La seconda volta non si scorda mai, by Francesco Ranieri Martinotti (2009)
 Feisbum, episodes by Alessandro Capone, Dino Giarrusso, Laura Luchetti, Mauro Mancini, Serafino Murri, Giancarlo Rolandi, and Emanuele Sana (2009)
 Draquila – L'Italia che trema, by Sabina Guzzanti (2010)
 Due vite per caso, by Alessandro Aronadio (2010)
 Napoli 24 (2010)
 Into Paradiso, by Paola Randi (2010)
 La Brigade, by Cécile Allegra (2012)

As film director
 Portrait from a set (2014)
 Racconto di guerra (2003)

References

 Stefano Masi, Dizionario mondiale dei direttori della fotografia, Recco, Le Mani, 2007.  pp. 34–35
 Edoardo Bruno, "FILMCRITICA", l'Occhio umile",Roma, Tip. Visigalli-Pasetti, 2007.  pp. 09–11

External links
 
 
 Emoticron official website

Photographers from Naples
1973 births
Living people
University of Naples Federico II alumni
Film people from Naples